The 2020 Atlantic Coast Conference baseball tournament was scheduled to be held from May 19 through 24 at BB&T Ballpark in Charlotte, North Carolina.  The annual tournament determines the conference champion of the Division I Atlantic Coast Conference for college baseball.  The tournament champion was to receive the league's automatic bid to the 2020 NCAA Division I baseball tournament.  This was scheduled to be the last of 19 athletic championship events held by the conference in the 2019–20 academic year.

On March 12, 2020, the NCAA cancelled all winter and spring sports championships due to the coronavirus pandemic, thus cancelling the tournament. This was the first time the tournament wasn't held since 1979, and the second time since the inaugural tournament in 1973.

References

Tournament
Atlantic Coast Conference baseball tournament
Atlantic Coast Conference baseball tournament
Atlantic Coast Conference baseball tournament
Atlantic Coast Conference baseball tournament
College baseball tournaments in North Carolina
Baseball competitions in Charlotte, North Carolina